Dasychira dorsipennata, the sharp-lined tussock or hardwood tussock moth, is a species of tussock moth in the family Erebidae. It was first described by William Barnes and James Halliday McDunnough in 1919 and it is found in North America.

The MONA or Hodges number for Dasychira dorsipennata is 8293.

References

Further reading

 
 
 

Lymantriinae
Articles created by Qbugbot
Moths described in 1919